Stenoma sesquitertia is a moth in the family Depressariidae. It was described by Philipp Christoph Zeller in 1854. It is found in Peru, the Guianas and Brazil.

Adults are pale fawn colour, with the forewings much rounded at their tips, the curve commencing before the end of the costa. There are three black spots before the middle, and a black dot in the disc beyond the middle. The first spot is in a line with the dot and the second is more hindward than the first, and a little more exterior. The third is elongate, and located behind the second. The hindwings are brownish cinereous.

References

Moths described in 1854
Stenoma
Taxa named by Philipp Christoph Zeller